{{Speciesbox
| image = Urutú-cruzeiro (Bothrops alternatus).jpg
| genus = Bothrops
| species = alternatus
| authority = A.M.C. Duméril, Bibron & A.H.A. Duméril, 1854
| synonyms = *Craspedocephalus Brasiliensis (<small>non Lacépède) Gray, 1849
Bothrops alternatus A.M.C. Duméril, Bibron & A.H.A. Duméril, 1854Trigonocephalus alternatus – Jan, 1859
Lachesis alternatus – Boulenger, 1896
Lachesis alternata – Boettger, 1898
Lachesis inaequalis Magalhaes, 1925
Bothrops alternata – Amaral, 1925
Lachesis (Bothrops) alternata – Gliesch, 1931
Trimeresurus alternatus – Pope, 1944
Bothrops alternatus – J.A. Peters & Orejas-Miranda, 1970
Rhinocerophis alternatus – Fenwick et al., 2009
}}Common names: yarará grande, urutu, wutu, crossed pit viper.Bothrops alternatus' is a highly venomous pit viper species found in South America (Brazil, Paraguay, Uruguay and Argentina). Within its range, it is an important cause of snakebite. The specific name, alternatus, which is Latin for "alternating", is apparently a reference to the staggered markings along the body. No subspecies are currently recognized.

Description

Size

Color and markings

The scalation includes 25-35 (usually 27-31/29-33 in males/females) rows of dorsal scales at midbody, 155-183/164-190 ventral scales in males/females, and 38-53/30-44 subcaudal scales in males/females. On the head there are 8-13 strongly keeled intersupraocular scales, 8-10 supralabial scales, none of which are fused with the prelacunal, and 12-14 sublabial scales.

The color pattern is exceedingly variable. The ground color may be brown, tan or gray, sometimes with an olive cast. The top of the head is usually chocolate brown to almost black with a range of transverse and longitudinal tan to white markings. On the body, there is a series of 22-28 dorsolateral markings that are chocolate brown to black in color and boldly bordered in cream or white. Along the vertebral line, these markings may either oppose or alternate. Each marking is widened and invaded from underneath by the paler ground color so that it either looks like a cross, encloses a darker blotch, or divides the marking into three parts to give it the shape of a headphone. On the tail, the pattern fuses to form a zigzag pattern. In some specimens, the pattern is so concentrated that there is no difference in color between the markings and the interspaces. The ventral surface includes a dark brown to black stripe that starts at the neck and runs down to the tail tip. Aberrant specimens, described by Lema (1960, 1987), had dark dorsal stripes running down the length of the body.

Common namesUrutu, wutu, crossed pit viper. The common names urutu and wutu refer to the crescent markings on the body.

In Argentina, it is referred to as víbora de la cruz and yarará grande. In Brazil it is called boicoatiara, boicotiara (Tupi dialect), coatiara, cotiara (southern Brazil), cruzeira, cruzeiro, jararaca de agosto (Rio Grande do Sul, Lagoa dos Patos region), jararaca rabo-de-porco (Rio Grande do Sul), and urutu. In Paraguay it is called mbói-cuatiá, mbói-kwatiara (Gí dialect), and yarará acácusú (Guaraní dialect). In Uruguay it is referred to as crucera, víbora de la cruz and yarará.

Geographic range

Found in southeastern Brazil, Paraguay, Uruguay and northern Argentina. In Argentina it is found in the provinces of Buenos Aires, Catamarca, Córdoba, Corrientes, Chaco, Entre Ríos, Formosa, La Pampa, Misiones, San Luis, Santa Fe, Santiago del Estero and  Tucumán. The type locality is listed as "Amérique méridionale" and "Paraguay."

Habitat
Occurs in tropical and semitropical forests, as well as temperate deciduous forests. According to Gallardo (1977), it prefers marshes, low-lying swamps, riparian zones and other humid habitats. It is also said to be common in sugarcane plantations. It is found in a variety of habitats depending on the latitude, including open fields and rocky areas in the Sierra de Achiras in Córdoba and the Sierra de la Ventana in Buenos Aires in Argentina, fluvial areas, grasslands and cerrado. However, it is usually absent in dry environments.

Reproduction
Females, depending on their size, give birth to varying numbers of live young. Cardinale and Avila (1997) collected one female in 1995 that was found to contain 26 embryos. Haller and Martins (1999) determined that the species produces 1-24 offspring at a time. Neonates are identical to the adults, except that they are more brightly colored. Neonates are capable of a venomous strike immediately when they are born.

Venom
An important cause of snakebite within its range, bites are rarely fatal but frequently cause severe local tissue damage. Although Spix and Martius (1824) found that it had a reputation for being one of the most venomous snakes in Brazil, its bite "said to occasion almost certain death", the statistics tell a different story. In his survey of 6,601 snakebite cases in Central and South America, Fonseca (1949) found that 384 were attributed to this species and that, of that number, only eight were fatal (2%).

In a study by Baub et al. (1994) of the case histories of 32 patients bitten by this species and admitted to the hospital in Catanduva, São Paulo, Brazil, all developed local pain and swelling. Furthermore, in 97% of all cases the blood clotting time was prolonged (more than 12 minutes), 41% had bleeding (usually from the gums), 32% had local blistering and 9% had necrosis. In all cases, specific antivenin was used and there were no deaths. These findings contrast with other reports involving much more tissue damage. Silva Jr. (1956) includes a description of a Brazilian patient with gangrene on the hand and forearm that required amputation, as well as another bitten four years previously who had scarring over the anterior tibial compartment. Abalos and Pirosky (1963) considered this species to be responsible for many of the total number of snakebite cases in Argentina and included a picture of a young boy, bitten below the knee, with the bare fibula and tibia exposed. In 2004, a 44-year-old woman died from a bleed in the brain after getting bitten at her home.

References

Further reading

Duméril AMC, Bibron G, & Dumèril A[HA]. 1854. Erpétologie générale ou histoire naturelle complète des reptiles. Tome septième [7th]. Duexième [2nd] partie. Librairie Encyclopédique de Roret, Paris. pp. 781–1536. (Bothrops alternatus, p. 1512.)

External links

.  Accessed 9 April 2019.  The repeated "cross" motif on its sides gives rise to its Spanish common name víbora de la cruz''.

Reptiles described in 1854
alternatus
Reptiles of Argentina
Reptiles of Brazil
Reptiles of Paraguay
Reptiles of Uruguay
Taxa named by Gabriel Bibron
Taxa named by André Marie Constant Duméril
Taxa named by Auguste Duméril